The 1912 Hereford by-election was held on 8 March 1912.  The by-election was held due to the resignation of the incumbent Conservative MP, John Arkwright.  It was won by the Liberal Unionist candidate William Hewins, who was unopposed.

References

1912 in England
Politics of Hereford
1912 elections in the United Kingdom
By-elections to the Parliament of the United Kingdom in Herefordshire constituencies
Unopposed by-elections to the Parliament of the United Kingdom (need citation)
20th century in Herefordshire